De Wolden is a municipality in the northeastern Netherlands in the province of Drenthe.

Population centres

Topography

Dutch topographic map of the municipality of De Wolden, June 2015

Notable people 

 Jan Evertsen Cloppenburgh (1571 in Ruinen – 1648) a Dutch publisher during the Dutch Golden Age
 Steven van Voorhees (1600 in Hees – 1684) an early Dutch settler in America
 Henrik Ruse, Baron of Rysensteen (1624 in Ruinen - 1679) a Dutch officer and fortification engineer
 Hendrikje Doelen (1784 in Oosterwijk – 1847) a Dutch serial killer
 Jan Arend Godert de Vos van Steenwijk II (1818 in De Wijk – 1905) a Dutch politician and president of the senate 1874/1880
 Jan Hendrik de Boer (1899 in Ruinen – 1971) a Dutch physicist and chemist
 Jan Vayne (1966 in Zuidwolde) a Dutch pianist
 Korie Homan (born 1986 in de Wijk) a Dutch former wheelchair tennis player and gold medallist at the 2008 Paralympics

Gallery

References

External links
Official website

 
Municipalities of Drenthe
Municipalities of the Netherlands established in 1998